Gabrielle Anne Cisterne de Courtiras, vicomtesse de Saint-Mars (2 August 180411 September 1872), pen name Countess Dash, was a prolific French writer.

Biography
Gabrielle de Courtiras was a daughter of M. de Courtiras, and early married the Marquis de Saint-Mars. After the loss of her fortune, she took to writing. On her remarking that she wished to write under a pseudonym, that of her favorite dog, “Dash,” was suggested, which she adopted.

In many years she produced five to six novels. Her themes are mainly from the beau monde era in France and deal with themes of romantic love.

Works
Le jeu de la reine, her first work (1839)
Les amours de Bussy-Rabutin (1850)
La pomme d'Eve (1853)
La belle aux yeux d'or (1860)
Les galanteries de la cour de Louis XV (1861)
La sorcière du roi (1861)
Le nain du diable (1862)
Les derniers amours de Mme. Dubarry (1864)
La bague empoisonnée (1866)
Comment tombent les femmes (1867)
Les aventures d'une jeune mariée (1870)
A collection of her works was published in 1864, in 34 volumes.

Notes

References

The Online Books Page

1804 births
1872 deaths
19th-century French women writers
19th-century women writers
French historical novelists
French women novelists
French vicomtesses
People from Poitiers
19th-century French novelists
Women historical novelists